Oswine, Oswin or Osuine (died 20 August 651) was a King of Deira in northern England.

Life
Oswine succeeded King Oswald of Northumbria, probably around the year 644, after Oswald's death at the Battle of Maserfield. Oswine was the son of Osric. His succession, perhaps the choice of the people of Deira, split the Kingdom of Northumbria. Oswiu was the successor of Bernicia to the north.

After seven years of peaceful rule, Oswiu declared war on Oswine. Oswine refused to engage in battle, instead retreating to Gilling and the home of his friend, Earl Humwald. Humwald betrayed Oswine, delivering him to Oswiu's soldiers by whom Oswine was put to death, probably at Diddersley Hill in North Yorkshire.

Bede described the death of King Oswine in 651 and wrote about a place called "Wilfaresdun, that is, Wilfar's Hill, which is almost ten miles distant from the village called Cataract towards the north-west. He himself [King Oswin], with only one trusty soldier, whose name was Tonhere, withdrew and lay concealed in the house of Earl Hunwald, whom he imagined to be his most assured friend. But, alas! it was otherwise; for the earl betrayed him, and Oswy, in a detestable manner, by the hands of his commander, Ethilwin, slew him..." In the text given to us by Bede:

Understanding this to describe a prominent hill located ten Roman miles (i.e. about 9 imperial miles along the old Roman road) northwest of Catterick, then we are left with one possible location for Wilfar's Hill: Diddersley Hill.

Veneration 
In Anglo-Saxon culture, it was assumed that the nearest kinsmen to a murdered person would seek to avenge the death or require some other kind of justice on account of it (such as the payment of wergild: a sum of money paid to the relatives of a slain man on account of the killing). However, Oswine's nearest kinsman was Oswiu's own wife. Oswiu was also related to the slain. In order to confront the justice that was seen to be owed for the murder, Oswiu founded Gilling Abbey, a monastery partly staffed by the relatives of both of their families, and this monastery was given the task of offering prayers for both Oswiu's salvation and Oswine's departed soul. It was from the same monastery, many years later, that Oswine was later claimed to be a saint.

Oswine is one of many Anglo-Saxon royals who were honoured in monasteries and developed cults as saints. Another example is Edward the Martyr.

Oswine was buried at Tynemouth, but the place of burial was later forgotten. It is said that his burial place was made known by an apparition to a monk named Edmund, and his relics were translated to an honorable place in Tynemouth Priory in 1065. According to Alban Butler, in 1103, Ranulf Flambard, Bishop of Durham, translated the remains from the chapel at Tynemouth, which had fallen into disrepair, to St Alban's Abbey in Hertfordshire.

There was a cult of Saint Oswin as a Christian martyr because he had died "if not for the faith of Christ, at least for the justice of Christ".

St Oswin's Church, Wylam
The Church of England parish church of Wylam, Northumberland, England is dedicated to Saint Oswin. The church was built in 1886 and currently has a congregation of about 150. The church has a peal of 6 bells (in the tower) and has regular Sunday services with ringing.

Our Lady & St Oswin's Church, Tynemouth
St Oswin is co-patron (with Our Lady) of the Catholic parish of Tynemouth with a church at the end of Front Street not far from the ruins of the priory where Oswin was buried.

References

Sources
Bede, Historia Ecclesiastica gentis Anglorum, ed. and tr. B. Colgrave and R.A.B. Mynors, Bede’s Ecclesiastical History of the English People. Oxford, 1969.
Anonymous, Vita Oswini (twelfth century), ed. James Raine, Miscellanea Biographica. Publications of the Surtees Society 8. London, 1858. 1-59. PDF available from Internet Archive.

Further reading
Chase, Colin. "Beowulf, Bede, and St. Oswine: The Hero's Pride in Old English Hagiography." The Anglo-Saxons. Synthesis and Achievement, ed. J. Douglas Woods and David A.E. Pelteret. Waterloo (Ontario), 1985. 37–48. Reprinted in The Beowulf Reader, ed. Peter S. Baker. New York and London, 2000. 181–93.

External links
 

651 deaths
Anglo-Saxon warriors
Deiran monarchs
Northumbrian saints
Yorkshire saints
7th-century Christian saints
7th-century English monarchs
Burials at Tynemouth Priory
Year of birth unknown
Medieval English saints
Roman Catholic royal saints